During the 2008–09 German football season, Hamburger SV competed in the Bundesliga.

Season summary
Hamburg finished fifth, eight points off first. They also made it to the semi-finals of the DFB-Pokal and the UEFA Cup, but were beaten by Werder Bremen in both competitions, on penalties and away goals respectively.

Players

First-team squad
Squad at end of season

Left club during season

Transfers

In

Out
 Otto Addo - retired

Competitions

Bundesliga

League table

UEFA Cup

First round

Group stage

Round of 32

Round of 16

Quarter-finals

Semi-finals

Werder Bremen 3–3 Hamburg on aggregate. Werder Bremen won on away goals.

References

Notes

Hamburger SV
Hamburger SV seasons